Lake Verevi (also known as Lake Elva or Elva Suurjärv) is a  lake located on the western side of the town of Elva in southern Estonia.

There is one main dock, that has two slides (a red one and a blue one), side by side. The big dock has an enclosed area used specifically for swimming. There is a smaller dock about 40 ft. out, that has two diving boards. Nearby there is a life guard house, where you can get First-Aid, or other necessities. There is a lot of tourist attraction during the summer time, with its beautiful area and surrounding forests.

See also
List of lakes of Estonia
Lake Arbi, another lake in Elva

References

Lakes of Estonia
Lakes of Tartu County
Tourist attractions in Tartu County